Chaux-lès-Clerval (literally Chaux near Clerval) is a former commune in the Doubs department in the Bourgogne-Franche-Comté region in eastern France. On 1 January 2019, it was merged into the commune Pays-de-Clerval.

Population

See also
 Clerval
 Communes of the Doubs department

References

Former communes of Doubs